Navarrese Foral Alliance (in Spanish: Alianza Foral Navarra) was a right-wing political party in Navarre, Spain. AFN was registered on March 7, 1977.

History
In the 1977 elections AFN formed a coalition with People's Alliance and gained 21,900 votes in Navarra (8.49%), failing to win any seat. AFN called for a 'No'-vote on the Spanish Constitution, as they considered the proposed Constitution to be atheist and Marxist.

In the 1979 elections no candidates; some of its members were integrated into the newly founded Unión del Pueblo Navarro.

After its dissolution, many party members joined the Navarrese People's Union (UPN).

References

Political parties in Navarre
Conservative parties in Spain
Catholic political parties
Political parties established in 1977
1977 establishments in Spain